Chapter V is the fifth studio album by American rock band Staind. It was released on August 9, 2005, and debuted at number one on the US Billboard 200 with first week sales of 185,000 copies, and spawned a hit single along with three moderately successful singles on rock radio. Its first single "Right Here" was the most successful at both rock and pop stations and it was used in a video package by World Wrestling Entertainment commemorating wrestler Edge after he won his first WWE Championship. "Falling" and "Everything Changes" have also been released with accompanying videos.

Lead singer Aaron Lewis has stated that he thinks "Chapter V is the best record the band has released to date", and the album continues the evolution from the messages on 14 Shades of Grey to messages of hope and uncertainty.  It also showcases a heavier side to the band on selected tracks (reminiscent of some content on Dysfunction), and emphasizes a balance between both styles of the band's sound.  The album includes a track called "Paper Jesus" targeted at record company executives who idolize money instead of music and "Reply", an open letter replying to fan mail that Aaron Lewis and the rest of the band have received over the years (the original version can be found on the Special Edition).

Since its release, it has sold 1,200,000 copies in the United States and 1,500,000  worldwide.  However, it marked Staind's lowest debut so far in the UK, at number 112.  All the same, it was regarded as one of the most anticipated albums of the year in the U.S. before its release.  A special edition, with five bonus tracks, an extra booklet, and a DVD was released several months later.  Even after a full year, it remained fairly consistent on the Billboard 200.  Aaron Lewis has said in relation to this in the booklet of the Special Edition of the album: "Having three straight number one albums was a nice big screw you to a lot of people who have slagged us.  Nobody can ever take away that fact."

Staind have promoted the album by allowing selected fans to preview it on their tour bus, and touring after its release for a whole year, including mini tours to Australia and solo tours across Europe, as well as the famous Fall Brawl Tour with Flyleaf, Taproot and P.O.D.  The band have also toured with 3 Doors Down, Hurt, Three Days Grace, Breaking Benjamin, and Seether (later cancelled) across the United States to promote the album.

Critical reception 

At Metacritic, the album received an average score of 48, based on 10 reviews, indicating "mixed or average reviews".

Track listing

Personnel 
 Aaron Lewis – lead vocals, rhythm guitar
 Mike Mushok – lead guitar
 Johnny April – bass, backing vocals
 Jon Wysocki – drums

Production
 David Bottrill – producer, mixing 
 Brian Sperber – audio engineering
 Bob Ludwig – mastering
 Jordan Schur – executive producer

Charts

Weekly charts

Year-end charts

Certifications

References 

Staind albums
2005 albums
Elektra Records albums
Albums produced by David Bottrill
Flip Records (1994) albums